Kanha Tiger Reserve, also known as Kanha–Kisli National Park, is one of the tiger reserves of India and the largest national park of the state of Madhya Pradesh. Kanha National Park was created on 1 June 1955 and was designated a tiger reserve in 1973.

This makes it the largest national park in central India.

The park hosts Bengal tiger, Indian leopard, sloth bear, barasingha and dhole. It is also the first tiger reserve in India to officially introduce a mascot, Bhoorsingh the Barasingha.

Flora 

Kanha Tiger Reserve is home to over 1000 species of flowering plants. The lowland forest is a mixture of sal (Shorea robusta) and other mixed-forest trees, interspersed with meadows. The highland forests are tropical moist, dry deciduous type and of a completely different nature from bamboo (Dendrocalamus strictus) on slopes. A notable Indian ghost tree (Davidia involucrata) can also be seen in the dense forest.

Fauna
Kanha Tiger Reserve hosts populations of Bengal tiger, Indian leopard, dhole, sloth bear, Bengal fox and Indian jackal. The barasingha is adapted to swampy areas. The gaur inhabits meadows and waterholes in the park.
Blackbuck has become very rare.

The reserve hosts around 300 species of birds and the most commonly seen birds are the black ibis, Asian green bee-eater, cattle egret, blossom-headed parakeet, Indian pond heron, drongo, common teal, crested serpent eagle, Indian grey hornbill, Indian roller, lesser adjutant, little grebe, lesser whistling teal, minivet, Malabar pied hornbill, woodpeckers, pigeon, paradise flycatcher, hill myna, Indian peafowl, red junglefowl, red-wattled lapwing, steppe eagle, Tickell's blue flycatcher, white-eyed buzzard, white-breasted kingfisher, white-browed fantail, wood shrikes, warblers, and vultures among many more.

Reintroduction of barasingha
An exciting conservation effort in this national park is the reintroduction of barasingha. The gaur will be relocated to Bandhavgarh and some barasingha will be relocated to Satpura Tiger Reserve. The objective of this project is to introduce about 500 barasingha in this national park to eight or nine different locations. There is also a project to capture about twenty tigers and relocate them to Satpura Tiger Reserve.

Tiger conservation and the Baiga tribe 
Members of the Baiga tribe, a semi-nomadic tribe of central India that is reliant on the forest, lived in 28 villages that had been within the Kanha National Park until 1968, when they were relocated. The relocation was part of an effort to maintain a critical tiger habitat. The land to which they were relocated is barren and they now suffer from alcoholism and malnourishment, and beg to support themselves. The last of the villages to be relocated for the tiger habitat is in the core zone of the Kanha Tiger Reserve. The area is the ancestral home of the Gond and Baiga tribes.
In January 2010, Baiga tribe were illegally evicted from the park without proper compensation from the government, according to Survival International.

In its efforts to maintain and restore tiger habitats, WWF-India has worked to create corridors that support the tigers and their prey, thereby stabilizing the tiger population. This includes efforts to prevent loss of life or property of humans, reduce human dependency on the forest, and reduce retaliatory killings of tigers when people have experienced losses.

However, Kanha's frontline staff continue to receive support, training and equipment from WWF, even as they carry out the eviction of the 22,000 residents who are to be forcibly resettled from tiger reserves in the region.

Transportation and access
The Jabalpur Airport  / 04:30hrs) has direct flights to and from Delhi, Mumbai, Kolkata, Hyderabad, Pune, Belgaum and Bhopal, with AirIndia, SpiceJet and IndiGo operating daily flights. Nagpur (Mukki  and Raipur (Mukki ) have other airports.

Jabalpur is a major railway stations with train connectivity across India. From Jabalpur, the best way to travel is via Mandla, which has a tourist taxi service to the park, and one can reach up to Chiraidongri the newly added Broad Gauge station via Jabalpur, Nainpur railway route to enter national park through Kanha gate. In pre-planned journey one of shortest road route is Jabalpur-Bargi Dam-Ganhsor-Thanwar Dam-Chiraidongri-Kanha National Park. Other route Jabalpur to Mandla (via NH-30)-Chiraidongri- Kanha route is preferred when arrival permission is to be taken from National Park authority at Mandla. This National Park can also be approached from Raipur - Gandai - Malanjkhand - Baihar highway route via Mukki Gate to National Park. M.P. Tourism and Private owners has hotels, resorts near to Mukki Gate. Similar stay facilities is also available at Khatia and Kanha Gate.

There are three gates for entrance into the park. The Kanha/Kisli gate is best accessed from Jabalpur and stops at the village Khatia, inside the buffer area. The second gate is at Mukki and the third, most recently opened, gate is at Sarhi.

Ecosystem valuation
An economic assessment study of Kanha Tiger Reserve estimated that the tiger reserve provides flow benefits worth 16.5 billion rupees (0.80 lakh / hectare) annually. Important ecosystem services from the tiger reserve include gene-pool protection (12.41 billion year), provisioning of water to downstream regions (558 million) and provisioning of fodder in buffer areas (546 million). Other services included recreation value (384 million), provision of habitat and refugia for wildlife (319 million) and sequestration of carbon (219 million).

See also
Arid Forest Research Institute

References

External links 

Eastern Highlands moist deciduous forests
National parks in Madhya Pradesh
Tiger reserves of India
Balaghat
Mandla
Protected areas established in 1955
Wildlife conservation in India
1955 establishments in India